Lumaria probolias is a species of moth of the family Tortricidae. It is found in India, Sri Lanka, Vietnam and Indonesia, including Java.

References

	

Moths described in 1907
Archipini